Rory Palmer (born 19 November 1981) is a former British Labour Party politician, who currently works for the charity Guide Dogs for the Blind.

Early life
He attended Hartland School (merged with Portland School in 2004) in Worksop in north Nottinghamshire.

He studied Social Policy at the University of York between 2000-2003,

Career
Palmer briefly worked for the Institute for Public Policy Research as a research assistant, before working for nearly five years as a parliamentary assistant to the Labour MPs John Mann and Peter Soulsby. Having first been elected for the Labour Party as a councillor for the Eyres Monsell ward of Leicester City Council in May 2007, he became one of the Council's deputy mayors in May 2011.

Political career
In the 2010 general election, he unsuccessfully stood as the Labour Party candidate in the Bosworth constituency in Leicestershire. In the 2014 European Parliament election, he was second on the Labour party list in the East Midlands constituency but was not elected. After the Labour MEP Glenis Willmott announced in July 2017 that she would stand down in October of that year Palmer succeeded her and became an MEP. He remained in this role until the United Kingdom's withdrawal from the EU on 31 January 2020.

References

1981 births
Living people
Alumni of the University of York
Councillors in Leicestershire
Labour Party (UK) parliamentary candidates
People from Leicester
People from Worksop
Labour Party (UK) MEPs
MEPs for England 2014–2019
MEPs for England 2019–2020